B&G Foods is an American branded foods holding company based in Parsippany, New Jersey. The company was formed in 1996 to acquire Bloch & Guggenheimer, a Manhattan-based producer of pickles, relish and condiments which had been founded in 1889.

B&G has been publicly traded since 2007 and its primary growth strategy is to acquire "orphaned" brands, those which no longer fit with their parent company's primary business. The company made 20 acquisitions between 1997 and 2017 and  held 51 brands mostly frozen and shelf-stable food.

History

Precursors 

The "B&G" name began in 1889 when two immigrants, Joseph Bloch and Julius Guggenheimer, started a pickle company, Bloch & Guggenheimer, Inc., in Manhattan. In its early days, B&G built a large pickle plant in Long Island City, Queens which the company operated until the 1970s when it moved production to Maryland. B&G produced pickles, relish, and other condiments under the B&G brand and by the 1980s they had become a significant retail and foodservice supplier in the New York City area.

In the 1980s, Dutch conglomerate Artal NV bought several North American food companies including B&G and M. Polaner, Inc. Leonard S. Polaner, who had led his family's business prior to its acquisition, was appointed president overseeing both companies.

These included B&G, Mother's Cookies, cheese producer Stella Foods of Green Bay, and Oakland-based Pacific Coast Baking Co., owner of San Francisco French Bread Co. and Gai's Seattle French Baking Co. Both Polaner and Wenner took executive positions with Specialty.

Foundation and early history 

A group of New York investors, Bruckmann, Rosser, Sherrill & Co., with assistance from Polaner and Wenner formed B Companies Holdings Corp. in 1996. The purpose of the company was to buy Bloch & Guggenheimer and snack foods producer Burns & Ricker, Inc. from Specialty. In 1997, following these successful acquisitions, the company took the name of its more notable subsidiary and was renamed B&G Foods Holdings Corp. Polaner became B&G's chairman and Wenner its president and CEO.

B&G immediately began acquiring additional food companies starting in June 1997 with several brands from Nabisco. These included Regina wine vinegar, Brer Rabbit molasses, Wright’s liquid smoke, and Vermont Maid syrups. In August it bought Louisiana-based Trappey’s Fine Foods, maker of Trappey's Hot Sauce and Red Devil hot sauces and pickled peppers, from McIlhenny Company.

Following a year of positive financial performance from the brands it had already acquired, B&G bought maple syrup and salad dressing producer Maple Grove Farms of Vermont and its natural foods brand Up Country Naturals in July 1998. American Home had placed Polaner under a subsidiary, International Home Foods, majority control of which had been acquired by a leveraged buyout firm in 1996.

These included B&M Baked Beans, Ac'cent and Sa-son Ac'cent flavor enhancers, Las Palmas Mexican food, Joan of Arc canned beans, and Underwood meat spreads. Pillsbury at the time said it was selling these brands so it could focus on its larger brands including Green Giant. While it continued to integrate these companies, B&G began a new line of business collaborating with chef Emeril Lagasse to develop the "Emeril's Original" brand of products.

After lackluster sales growth of just 4.6% in 2000 and significant long-term debt, B&G decided to sell off its Burns & Ricker business. Burns & Ricker had been one of 5 subsidiaries to see a decrease in sales that year and was sold to Nonnie's Food Company, Inc. in January 2001. By 2003, B&G was ready to start buying again and acquired the Ortega brand of Mexican chiles and sauces from Nestlé.

Reorganization 

In October 2004, B&G Foods Holdings Corp. became B&G Foods, Inc. having merged its then-subsidiary B&G Foods into the parent company. In 2007, the company began trading on the New York Stock Exchange with ticker symbol .

The company acquired Grandma's Molasses from Mott’s Company in 2006 and Cream of Wheat from Kraft Foods in 2007. In 2010 it acquired the brands of Violet Packing including Sclafani and Don Pepino tomato products. The Culver purchase included the Mrs. Dash (rebranded "Dash" in 2020), Molly McButter, Sugar Twin sugar substitute, and Baker's Joy baking spray with flour brands all of which Unilever had acquired when it bought The Alberto Culver Company. The purchase also included the Static Guard, and Kleen Guard brands of furniture polish, B&G's first non-food brands.

Specialty Brands' largest holding was the dry soup, pasta, and rice producer Bear Creek Country Kitchens. The purchase also included the Spring Tree, Cary's, and MacDonald's brands of maple and pancake syrup, New York Flatbreads, and Canoleo margarine. In its largest acquisition at the time, B&G acquired Green Giant and its associated brands Le Sueur and Le Sieur from General Mills in 2015. By the following year, B&G had expanded Green Giant's offerings with 25 new frozen vegetable products. In July 2016, B&G announced it would be moving production of pizza crust producer Mama Mary's, acquired in 2015, from its Spartanburg, South Carolina facilities to consolidate it into B&G's Yadkinville operations.

This brought B&G the Spice Islands, Tone's, and Durkee brands of spices and a licensing agreement to produce Weber brand sauces and seasonings. It also included a manufacturing facility in Ankeny, Iowa.

Clabber Girl produces baking powder, baking soda, corn starch, gelatins, and puddings under the Clabber Girl, Rumford, Davis, Hearth Club, and Royal brands. Also in 2020, B&G bought Wellesley, Massachusetts-based frozen vegan foods producer Farmwise Farms with a goal of complementing its existing Green Giant frozen vegetable products.

Kenneth C. "Casey" Keller was appointed B&G's president and CEO in June 2021 replacing interim president and CEO David L. Wenner who remained a board member. Keller had previously held leadership roles at various major foods brands including JDE Peet's, Peet's Coffee, Wrigley Company, Alberto-Culver, and Heinz. Wenner, who had led B&G from 1993 to 2014, took on the interim role following the 2020 resignation of Kenneth Romanzi.

In an effort to reduce costs and improve productivity, the company announced in August 2021 it would sell its Portland, Maine manufacturing facility. The plant had produced B&M products for over 100 years, Underwood products for over 50 years, and other B&G brands following B&M's acquisition. The facility's 86 employees were to be laid off and manufacturing operations moved to third-party and other B&G locations. The sale was expected to close by the end of 2021 with B&G's operational move completed by the first quarter of 2022. Following the sale, the facility would become the home of The Roux Institute at Northeastern University.

B&G brands 

B&G's portfolio includes a wide variety of brands:

 Ac'cent
 Sa-són Ac'cent
 B&G Pickles
 B&M Baked Beans
 Back to Nature
 Baker's Joy
 Bear Creek Country Kitchens
 Brer Rabbit
 Buena Vida
 Canoleo
 Cary's
 Clabber Girl
 Cream of Wheat
 Cream of Rice
 Crisco
 Dash (formerly Mrs. Dash)
 Davis
 Dec-A-Cake
 Devonsheer
 Don Pepino
 Durkee
 Farmwise Farms
 Fleischmann's
 Grandma's Molasses
 Green Giant
 Hearth Club
 Henri's
 JJ Flats
 Joan of Arc
 KC
 Las Palmas
 Le Sueur
 Le Sieur
 MacDonald's
 Mama Mary's
 Maple Grove Farms of Vermont
 McCann's Steel Cut Irish Oatmeal
 Molly McButter
 Mrs. Fanning's Bread & Butter Pickles
 New York Flatbreads
 New York Style
 Old London
 Ortega
 Polaner
 Regina
 Rickland Orchards
 Royal
 Rumford
 Sclafani
 Snackwell's
 Spice Islands
 Spring Tree
 Static Guard
 Sugar Twin
 Tone's
 Trappey's Hot Sauce
 Trappey's Red Devil
 TrueNorth
 Underwood
 Up Country Naturals
 Vermont Maid Syrup
 Victoria
 Wright's Liquid Smoke

B&G also produces products under brands licensed from other companies including Cinnamon Toast Crunch, Crock-Pot, Einstein Bros. Bagels, Emeril's Original, Skinnygirl, Twix, and Weber.

Controversies

Cream of Wheat branding 

B&G's Cream of Wheat was one of a number of brands subject to public pressure to change its branding due to perceived racist origins during the 2020 protests around racism. From its inception, the brand's packaging and marketing featured an African American chef character named "Rastus", a pejorative term for black men. B&G announced an "immediate review" of Cream of Wheat branding in June 2020 and in September said it would be removing the character from all Cream of Wheat packaging.

References

External links 

 

Food and drink companies based in New Jersey
Companies listed on the New York Stock Exchange
Food and drink companies established in 1996